The Atmashatakam, also known as Nirvanashatkam  (निर्वाणषट्कम्), is a non-dualistic (advaita) composition consisting of 6 verses or ślokas, attributed to the Hindu exegete Adi Shankara summarizing the basic teachings of Advaita Vedanta, or the Hindu teachings of non-dualism.

Etymology
"Ātma" is the True Self. "Nirvāṇa" is complete equanimity, peace, tranquility, freedom and joy. "Shatkam" means "six" or "consisting of six."

Origin
It is said that when Ādi Śaṅkara was a young boy of eight and wandering near River Narmada, seeking to find his guru, he encountered the seer Govinda Bhagavatpada who asked him, "Who are you?" The boy answered with these stanzas, and Swami Govindapada accepted Ādi Śaṅkara as his disciple. The verses are said to be valued to progress in contemplation practices that lead to Self-Realization.

Text 
The text is as follows:

I am not mind, nor intellect, nor ego, nor the reflections of inner self (citta).
I am not the five senses.
I am beyond that.
I am not the seven elements or the five sheaths (pañca-kośa).
I am indeed, That eternal knowing and bliss, the auspicious (Śivam), pure consciousness.

Neither can I be termed as energy (prāṇa), 
nor five types of breath (vāyus - Prāṇa, Apāna, Vyāna, Udāna, Samāna),
nor the seven material essences,
nor the five sheaths (pañca-kośa). 
Neither am I the organ of Speech, nor the organs for Holding ( Hand ), Movement ( Feet ) or Excretion.
I am indeed, That eternal knowing and bliss, the auspicious (Śivam), pure consciousness.

I have no hatred or dislike,
nor affiliation or liking, 
nor greed, 
nor delusion, 
nor pride or haughtiness,
nor feelings of envy or jealousy. 
I have no duty (dharma), 
nor any purpose (artha),
nor any desire (kāma), 
nor even liberation (mokṣa). 
I am indeed, That eternal knowing and bliss, the auspicious (Śivam), pure consciousness.

I have neither merit (virtue), 
nor demerit (vice). 
I do not commit sins or good deeds,
nor have happiness or sorrow, 
pain or pleasure. 
I do not need mantras, holy places, scriptures (Vedas), rituals or sacrifices (yajñas). 
I am none of the triad of the observer or one who experiences, the process of observing or experiencing, or any object being observed or experienced. 
I am indeed, That eternal knowing and bliss, the auspicious (Śivam), pure consciousness.

I do not have fear of death, as I do not have death.
I have no separation from my true self, no doubt about my existence, 
nor have I discrimination on the basis of caste or creed.
I have no father or mother,
nor did I have a birth. 
I am not the relative, 
nor the friend, 
nor the guru, 
nor the disciple. 
I am indeed, That eternal knowing and bliss, the auspicious (Śivam), pure consciousness.

I am all pervasive.
I am without any attributes, and without any form. 
I have neither attachment to the world, 
nor to liberation (mukti). 
I have no wishes for anything
because I am everything, 
everywhere, 
every time,
always in equilibrium. 
I am indeed, That eternal knowing and bliss, the auspicious (Śivam), pure consciousness.

References

External links
Isha foundation

Hindu texts
Adi Shankara
Sanskrit texts
Advaita Vedanta
Advaita Vedanta texts